Juan Manuel Cerúndolo was the defending champion but chose not to defend his title.

Franco Agamenone won the title after defeating Gian Marco Moroni 6–1, 6–4 in the final.

Seeds

Draw

Finals

Top half

Bottom half

References

External links
Main draw
Qualifying draw

Garden Open - 1
2022 Singles